Christiani is a surname. Notable people with the surname include:

Charles-Joseph Christiani (1772–1840), French Army officer
Cyril Christiani (1913–1938), Guyanese cricketer
David Christiani (1610–1688), German mathematician, philosopher and Lutheran theologian
David C. Christiani, American physician
Eddy Christiani (1918–2016), Dutch guitarist, singer and composer
Nick Christiani (born 1987), American baseball player
Pablo Christiani, 13th-century convert to Roman Catholicism from Judaism
Rita Christiani (1917-2008), Trinidad-born African-American dancer
Robert Christiani (1920–2005), Guyanese cricketer

See also
Christian (disambiguation)